Adalbert Steiner II (24 January 1907 – 10 December 1984) was a Romanian football defender.

Club career
His career in club football was spent at Unirea Timişoara between 1921–1922, he played at Chinezul Timişoara from 1922 until 1929 where he won three Divizia A titles and he finished his career in 1929–1930 at CA Timişoara.

International career
Adalbert Steiner played ten games for Romania. He and his brother Rudolf made their debut together in a 3–1 away victory against Turkey in 1926. Adalbert played two games at the 1929–31 Balkan Cup, a tournament that was won by Romania. He was part of Romania's squad at the 1930 World Cup playing in the first game, a 3–1 victory against Peru in which he got an injury from which he never recovered, ending his career.

Personal life
His father, Karl Steiner was an engineer that was born in Bohemia who settled in Temesvár where he got married and had eight children. One of Adalbert's brothers, Rudolf Steiner was also a footballer, they played together at Chinezul Timișoara and Romania's national team.

Honours
Chinezul Timişoara
Divizia A: 1924–25, 1925–26, 1926–27
Romania
Balkan Cup: 1929–31

Notes

References

External links

1907 births
1984 deaths
Sportspeople from Timișoara
People from the Kingdom of Hungary
Romanian footballers
Romania international footballers
Liga I players
1930 FIFA World Cup players
Association football defenders
CA Timișoara players
Chinezul Timișoara players